{{DISPLAYTITLE:C6H10O8}}
The molecular formula C6H10O8 (molar mass: 210.14 g/mol) may refer to:

 Saccharic acid, or glucaric acid
 Mucic acid, also known as galactaric acid or meso-galactaric acid

Molecular formulas